The provinces of the Democratic Republic of the Congo were divided into 26 districts. Those in turn were divided into territories or communes.

Planned reorganization
The 2006 constitution planned to convert many of the districts into provinces under a decentralization program. However, progress was slow. 
In October 2007 the Minister for Decentralization, Denis Kalume Numbi, presented a bill for Decentralization in the National Assembly. The subsequent debate turned up a variety of issues that first had to be addressed with changes to related laws.
In an October 2010 conclave of the ruling AMP coalition, it was proposed to revise Article 226, which calls for the creation of 26 provinces out of the current 11, in order to allow more time for the transition.
In September 2011 the position of "Minister of Decentralization" was abolished.

Districts and territories
The provinces of Maniema, Nord-Kivu and Sud-Kivu were not divided into districts. Those three provinces and all other districts were divided into territories. Most provinces also included cities, which were independent of the districts; in turn those were divided into communes.

Districts and cities, other than the capital city of Kinshasa, and their territories or communes consist of the following:

Kinshasa

The city of Kinshasa is divided into four districts and 24 communes:

See also
 Districts of the Belgian Congo
 Provinces of the Democratic Republic of the Congo
 Territories of the Democratic Republic of the Congo
 Proposed provinces of the Democratic Republic of the Congo

References

 
Congo, Democratic Republic of, Districts
Democratic Republic of the Congo geography-related lists